Capilla de la Balesquida is a church in Asturias, Spain. The church was established in 1232.

See also
Asturian art
Catholic Church in Spain
Churches in Asturias
List of oldest church buildings

References

1232 establishments
13th-century establishments in Spain
Churches in Asturias
Llanes
Roman Catholic chapels in Spain